Henry Mondeaux (born September 19, 1995) is an American football defensive end for the New York Giants of the National Football League (NFL). He played college football at Oregon.

Professional career

New Orleans Saints
After playing four years at Oregon, Mondeaux was signed by the New Orleans Saints as an undrafted free agent on May 7, 2018. He was waived on September 1 and signed to the practice squad on December 31, where he spent the rest of the season.

Kansas City Chiefs
On January 26, 2019, Mondeaux signed with the Kansas City Chiefs on a reserve/future deal and was waived on May 3.

Pittsburgh Steelers
On May 13, 2019, Mondeaux signed with the Pittsburgh Steelers after a tryout, but was waived on August 31. A day later, he was signed to the Steelers' practice squad, where he spent the entire season.

On December 30, 2019, Mondeaux re-signed with the Steelers to a reserve/future contract, but was waived on September 5, 2020 and subsequently signed to the practice squad. On October 23, he was promoted to the active roster.

On September 3, 2021, Mondeaux was waived by the Steelers and re-signed to the practice squad. On September 20, 2021, Mondeaux was promoted to the active roster after an injury to Tyson Alualu.

On August 30, 2022, Mondeaux was waived by the Steelers.

New York Giants
On September 1, 2022, the New York Giants signed Mondeaux to their practice squad. Mondeaux was elevated from the practice squad for Week 3 and Week 4 games against the Dallas Cowboys and Chicago Bears. He was elevated from the practice squad for the third time this season for Week 10 game against the Houston Texans. He was promoted to the active roster on November 14.

References

External links
Oregon Ducks bio

1995 births
Living people
American football defensive ends
Kansas City Chiefs players
New Orleans Saints players
Oregon Ducks football players
Pittsburgh Steelers players
Players of American football from Portland, Oregon
New York Giants players